The 2023 season is the 21st season in the history of Sport Club Corinthians Paulista (women). In addition to the domestic league, Corinthians will participate in this season's editions of the Supercopa do Brasil, Copa Libertadores Femenina and Campeonato Paulista. There will be a mid-season break due to the 2023 FIFA Women's World Cup in July-August.

Background

Kit
 Home: White shirt, black shorts and white socks;
 Away: Black shirt, white shorts and black socks;
 Third: Beige shirt with shodô stripes, black shorts and beige socks.

Squad

Transfers

Transfers in

Loans in

Transfers out

Loans out

Squad statistics

Overview

Supercopa do Brasil

Campeonato Brasileiro

Results

Campeonato Paulista

Corinthians will enter the competition in the group stage.

Copa Libertadores

Corinthians will enter the competition in the group stage.

See also
List of Sport Club Corinthians Paulista (women) seasons

Notes

References

External links

Sport Club Corinthians Paulista seasons
Corinthians